Clara Marques Mendes (born 1970) is a Portuguese lawyer and politician. She represents the Social Democratic Party (PSD) in the Assembly of the Republic of Portugal.

Family
Maria Clara Gonçalves Marques Mendes was born on 30 April 1970. She is the daughter of Maria Isabel Gonçalves and her husband, António Marques Mendes, who was a lawyer and co-founder of the Social Democratic Party. Her brother is a former leader of the PSD, Luís Marques Mendes. She married Sérgio Lobo Ribeiro in 2016.

Political career
Clara Marques Mendes obtained a degree in law and then practised law at her father's law office in Fafe, a town in the northern Portuguese district of Braga. Invited to be part of the PSD list for Braga in the 2011 national elections, she was elected to the Assembly of the Republic. She was re-elected in 2015, 2019 and 2022. From 2013 to 2020 she was also a deputy in the municipal assembly of Fafe.

Mendes has been a member of the Parliamentary Committee on Work and Social Security, an alternate on the Committee on European Matters and, more recently, and an alternate on the committee that investigates ways of achieving economic and social recovery from COVID-19.

References

1970 births
Living people
Members of the Assembly of the Republic (Portugal)
Women members of the Assembly of the Republic (Portugal)
Social Democratic Party (Portugal) politicians